Marron or Marrón is a Spanish surname, which is most common today in Mexico. Notable people with the surname include:

Donald B. Marron Sr. (1934–2019), American financier, private equity investor and entrepreneur
Donald B. Marron Jr., American economist
Juan María Marrón (1808–1853), settler of Mexican California
Loretta Marron (born 1951), chief executive officer of the Australian Friends of Science in Medicine
Paul-Henri Marron (1754–1832), French-Dutch pastor
R. V. Marron (1899–1978), American football coach
Sam Marron (1884–1954), Australian footballer
Saul Marron (born 1981), Scottish actor

Spanish-language surnames